Antonio Manuel Diaz (born January 23, 1977) is a Dominican professional baseball coach. He is the assistant bench coach for the Minnesota Twins of Major League Baseball (MLB).

Career
Diaz was raised in the Dominican Republic. He received multiple professional contract offers as a teenager but, on the advice of his youth coach, Manny Mota, he emigrated to the United States at 18 to play college baseball instead.

He started his college baseball career at Gulf Coast State College before moving to Florida International University where he played for the FIU Panthers baseball team. According to coach Danny Price, he was a professional prospect until suffering an arm injury. After his college career, a former teammate recommended him as a baseball coach to the Colorado Rockies who were looking specifically for bilingual coaches.

He graduated from Florida International University with a bachelor's degree in marketing. He served as the manager for the baseball team at G. Holmes Braddock High School in Miami, Florida. Diaz served as the hitting coach for the Casper Ghosts from 2001 through 2006, taking over as their manager in 2007.

The Rockies hired Diaz as their major league first base coach before the 2017 season. After the 2018 season, the Twins hired Diaz as their third base coach, replacing Gene Glynn. He transitioned to the assistant bench coach role in 2022.

Personal life
Diaz has two children. He and his wife, Lauren live in Scottsdale, Arizona.

His father, Manuel, was shot to death in a mugging in Santo Domingo at 73 years old a few years before Diaz's first Major League coaching job.

References

External links

1977 births
Living people
Colorado Rockies (baseball) coaches
Dominican Republic baseball coaches
Minnesota Twins coaches
Minor league baseball coaches
Minor league baseball managers
FIU Panthers baseball players
Florida International University alumni
Gulf Coast State Commodores baseball players
Major League Baseball first base coaches
Major League Baseball third base coaches
Sportspeople from Santo Domingo
Dominican Republic expatriate baseball people in the United States